Fatemeh Bahrayni (5 August 1922 – 23 October 2009), better known as Roza Montazemi, was an Iranian author of cookbooks. Her cookbook Honar-e Aashpazi (The Art of Cooking) has been in publication since 1964–1965 and is now in its 41st edition with 1700 Iranian and non-Iranian recipes.

She was born 5 August 1922. She died in Tehran on 23 October 2009.

References

External links
 Official website (in Persian)

1922 births
2009 deaths
Iranian women writers
Iranian chefs
Women cookbook writers
Women food writers
Iranian cookbook writers